Schirmer Records was a United States based record label, active in the 1940s and 1950s.

Schirmer released recordings of jazz, swing music, and classical music, by artists ranging from Eddie Condon to Rudolf Friml.

See also
 List of record labels

Defunct record labels of the United States
Jazz record labels
Classical music record labels